The 1931–32 Torquay United F.C. season was Torquay United's fifth season in the Football League and their fifth consecutive season in Third Division South.  The season runs from 1 July 1931 to 30 June 1932.

Overview
Having just enjoyed their most successful season so far in the Football League, Torquay United were keen to build upon last season's achievements.  Unfortunately, the season got off to a terrible start with an opening day 7–0 defeat at Crystal Palace.  After conceding six goals to Watford in their second home game of the season, Torquay then had to endure a mortifying 10–2 defeat to Fulham at Craven Cottage.  Results did slowly begin to improve after that humiliation but Torquay would never find themselves any higher than 15th in the League table all season.  The team were also to make an early exit from the FA Cup, losing 3–1 at home to Southend United in the First Round.

Torquay also had to make do without last season's top goalscorer Jimmy Trotter for the second half of the season after he was sold to Watford in December.   Billy Clayson did his best to fill Trotter's boots, eventually becoming this season's top scorer.  However, Cyril Hemingway, returning for his second spell at the club, could not recreate the form which saw him top Torquay's goalscoring charts for the 1928–29 season.  Nevertheless, Paignton born striker George Stabb showed much potential after signing from Dartmouth United, while another local lad, Lew Tapp, was also a promising new addition to the defence.

Torquay did at least have one memorable victory with an 8–1 defeat of Bristol Rovers on Easter Monday, but it was ultimately a hugely disappointing season for Frank Womack and the team.  Finishing in 19th place and narrowly avoiding the need for re-election, it was clear that Torquay United were in desperate need of improvement.

League statistics

Third Division South

Results summary

Results by round

Results

Third Division South

FA Cup

Club statistics

First team appearances

Source:

Top scorers

Source:

Transfers

In

Out

References

External links

Torquay United F.C.
Torquay United F.C. seasons